

Events

Pre-1600
 637 – Arab–Byzantine wars: Antioch surrenders to the Rashidun Caliphate after the Battle of the Iron Bridge.
 758 – Guangzhou is sacked by Arab and Persian pirates.
1137 – Ranulf of Apulia defeats Roger II of Sicily at the Battle of Rignano, securing his position as duke until his death two years later.
1270 – The Eighth Crusade ends by an agreement between Charles I of Anjou (replacing his deceased brother King Louis IX of France) and the Hafsid dynasty of Tunis, Tunisia.
1340 – Reconquista: Portuguese and Castilian forces halt a Muslim invasion at the Battle of Río Salado.

1601–1900
1657 – Anglo-Spanish War: Spanish forces fail to retake Jamaica at the Battle of Ocho Rios.
1806 – War of the Fourth Coalition: Convinced that he is facing a much larger force, Prussian General von Romberg, commanding 5,300 men, surrenders the city of Stettin to 800 French soldiers.
1817 – Simón Bolívar becomes President of the Third Republic of Venezuela.
1831 – Nat Turner is arrested for leading the bloodiest slave rebellion in United States history.
1863 – Danish Prince Vilhelm arrives in Athens to assume his throne as George I, King of the Hellenes.
1864 – The Treaty of Vienna is signed, by which Denmark relinquishes one province each to Prussia and Austria.
1888 – The Rudd Concession is granted by Matabeleland to agents of Cecil Rhodes.

1901–present
1905 – Czar Nicholas II issues the October Manifesto, nominally granting the Russian peoples basic civil liberties and the right to form a duma. (October 17 in the Julian calendar)
1918 – World War I: The Ottoman Empire signs the Armistice of Mudros with the Allies.
  1918   – World War I: Lands of the Crown of Saint Stephen, a state union of Kingdom of Hungary and Triune Kingdom of Croatia, Slavonia and Dalmatia is abolished with decisions of Croatian and Hungarian parliaments
1920 – The Communist Party of Australia is founded in Sydney.
1938 – Orson Welles broadcasts a radio adaptation of H. G. Wells's The War of the Worlds, causing a massive panic in some of the audience in the United States.
1941 – President Roosevelt approves $1 billion in Lend-Lease aid to the Allied nations.
  1941   – Holocaust: Fifteen hundred Jews from Pidhaytsi are sent by Nazis to Bełżec extermination camp.
1942 – World War II: Lt. Tony Fasson and Able Seaman Colin Grazier drown while taking code books from the sinking German submarine U-559.
1944 – Holocaust: Anne and Margot Frank are deported from Auschwitz to the Bergen-Belsen concentration camp, where they die from disease the following year, shortly before the end of WWII.
1945 – Jackie Robinson of the Kansas City Monarchs signs a contract for the Brooklyn Dodgers, breaking the baseball color line.
1947 – The General Agreement on Tariffs and Trade (GATT), the foundation of the World Trade Organization (WTO), is founded.
1948 – A luzzu fishing boat overloaded with passengers capsizes and sinks in the Gozo Channel off Qala, Gozo, Malta, killing 23 of the 27 people on board.
1953 – President Eisenhower approves the top-secret document NSC 162/2 concerning the maintenance of a strong nuclear deterrent force against the Soviet Union.
1956 – Hungarian Revolution: The government of Imre Nagy recognizes newly-established revolutionary workers' councils. Army officer Béla Király leads anti-Soviet militias in an attack on the headquarters of the Hungarian Working People's Party.
1959 – Piedmont Airlines Flight 349 crashes on approach to Charlottesville–Albemarle Airport in Albemarle County, Virginia, killing 26 of the 27 on board.
1961 – The Soviet Union detonates the Tsar Bomba, the most powerful explosive device ever detonated.
  1961   – Due to "violations of Vladimir Lenin's precepts", it is decreed that Joseph Stalin's body be removed from its place of honour inside Lenin's tomb and buried near the Kremlin Wall with a plain granite marker.
1968 – A squad of 120 North Korean Army commandos land in boats along a 25-mile long section of the eastern coast of South Korea in a failed attempt to overthrow the dictatorship of Park Chung-hee and bring about the reunification of Korea.
1973 – The Bosphorus Bridge in Turkey is completed, connecting the continents of Europe and Asia over the Bosphorus for the second time.
1975 – Prince Juan Carlos I of Spain becomes acting head of state, taking over for the country's ailing dictator, Gen. Francisco Franco.
  1975   – Forty-five people are killed when Inex-Adria Aviopromet Flight 450 crashes into Suchdol, Prague, while on approach to Prague Ruzyně Airport (now Václav Havel Airport Prague) in Czechoslovakia (present-day Czech Republic).
1980 – El Salvador and Honduras agree to put the border dispute fought over in 1969's Football War before the International Court of Justice.
1983 – The first democratic elections in Argentina, after seven years of military rule, are held.
  1983   – A magnitude 6.6 earthquake in the Turkish provinces of Erzurum and Kars leaves approximately 1,340 people dead.
1985 – Space Shuttle Challenger lifts off for mission STS-61-A, its final successful mission.
1991 – The Israeli-Palestinian conflict: The Madrid Conference commences in an effort to revive peace negotiations between Israel and Palestine.
1995 – Quebec citizens narrowly vote (50.58% to 49.42%) in favour of remaining a province of Canada in their second referendum on national sovereignty.
2005 – The rebuilt Dresden Frauenkirche (destroyed in the firebombing of Dresden during World War II) is reconsecrated after a thirteen-year rebuilding project.
2013 – Forty-five people are killed and seven injured after a bus catches fire in Mahabubnagar district, Andhra Pradesh (present-day Telangana), India.
2014 – Sweden becomes the first European Union member state to officially recognize the State of Palestine.
  2014   – Four people are killed when a Beechcraft Super King Air crashes at Wichita Dwight D. Eisenhower National Airport in Wichita, Kansas.
2015 – A fire in a nightclub in the Romanian capital of Bucharest kills sixty-four people and leaves more than 147 injured.
2020 – A magnitude 7.0 earthquake strikes the Aegean Sea between Greece and Turkey, triggering a tsunami. At least 119 people die mainly due to collapsed buildings.
2022 – A pedestrian suspension bridge collapses in the city of Morbi, Gujarat, leading to the deaths of at least 135 people.

Births

Pre-1600
39 BC – Julia the Elder, Roman daughter of Augustus (d. 14)
1218 – Emperor Chūkyō of Japan (d. 1234)
1327 – Andrew, Duke of Calabria (d. 1345)
1447 – Lucas Watzenrode, Prince-Bishop of Warmia (d. 1512)
1492 – Anne d'Alençon, French noblewoman (d. 1562)
1513 – Jacques Amyot, French bishop and translator (d. 1593)
1558 – Jacques-Nompar de Caumont, duc de La Force, Marshal of France (d. 1652)

1601–1900
1624 – Paul Pellisson, French historian and author (d. 1693)
1632 – Christopher Wren, English physicist, mathematician, and architect, designed St Paul's Cathedral (d. 1723)
1660 – Ernest August, Duke of Schleswig-Holstein-Sonderburg-Augustenburg (d. 1731)
1668 – Sophia Charlotte of Hanover (d. 1705)
1712 – Giovanni Pietro Francesco Agius de Soldanis, Maltese linguist, historian and cleric (d. 1770)
1728 – Mary Hayley, English businesswoman (d. 1808)
1735 – John Adams, American lawyer and politician, 2nd President of the United States (d. 1826)
1741 – Angelica Kauffman, painter (d. 1807)
1751 – Richard Brinsley Sheridan, Irish-English poet, playwright, and politician, Treasurer of the Navy (d. 1816)
1762 – André Chénier, Turkish-French poet and playwright (d. 1794)
1786 – Philippe-Joseph Aubert de Gaspé, Canadian captain and author (d. 1871)
1799 – Ignace Bourget, Canadian bishop (d. 1885)
1839 – Alfred Sisley, French-English painter (d. 1899)
1857 – Georges Gilles de la Tourette, French-Swiss physician and neurologist (d. 1904)
1861 – Antoine Bourdelle, French sculptor and painter (d. 1929)
1868 – António Cabreira, Portuguese polygraph (d. 1953)
1871 – Buck Freeman, American baseball player (d. 1949)
  1871   – Paul Valéry, French poet and philosopher (d. 1945)
1873 – Francisco I. Madero, Mexican businessman and politician, 33rd President of Mexico (d. 1913)
1877 – Hugo Celmiņš, Latvian politician, Prime Minister of Latvia (d. 1941)
1878 – Arthur Scherbius, German electrical engineer, invented the Enigma machine (d. 1929)
1881 – Elizabeth Madox Roberts, American poet and author (d. 1941)
1882 – Oldřich Duras, Czech chess player and composer (d. 1957)
  1882   – William Halsey Jr., American admiral (d. 1959)
  1882   – Günther von Kluge, Polish-German field marshal (d. 1944)
1885 – Ezra Pound, American poet and critic (d. 1972)
1886 – Zoë Akins, American author, poet, and playwright (d. 1958)
1887 – Sukumar Ray, Indian-Bangladeshi author, poet, and playwright (d. 1923)
1888 – Louis Menges, American soccer player, soldier, and politician (d. 1969)
  1888   – Konstantinos Tsiklitiras, Greek footballer and high jumper (d. 1913)
1893 – Charles Atlas, Italian-American bodybuilder (d. 1972)
  1893   – Roland Freisler, German soldier, lawyer, and judge (d. 1945)
1894 – Jean Rostand, French biologist and philosopher (d. 1977)
  1894   – Peter Warlock, English composer and critic (d. 1930)
1895 – Gerhard Domagk, German pathologist and bacteriologist, Nobel Prize laureate (d. 1964)
  1895   – Dickinson W. Richards, American physician and physiologist, Nobel Prize laureate (d. 1973)
1896 – Rex Cherryman, American actor (d. 1928)
  1896   – Ruth Gordon, American actress and screenwriter (d. 1985)
  1896   – Kostas Karyotakis, Greek poet and educator (d. 1928)
  1896   – Harry R. Truman, American soldier (d. 1980)
  1896   – Antonino Votto, Italian conductor (d. 1985)
1897 – Agustín Lara, Mexican singer-songwriter and actor (d. 1970)
1898 – Bill Terry, American baseball player and manager (d. 1989)
1900 – Ragnar Granit, Finnish-Swedish physiologist and academic, Nobel Prize laureate (d. 1991)

1901–present
1905 – Johnny Miles, English-Canadian runner (d. 2003)
1906 – Giuseppe Farina, Italian race car driver (d. 1966)
  1906   – Hermann Fegelein, German general (d. 1945)
  1906   – Alexander Gode, German-American linguist and translator (d. 1970)
1907 – Sol Tax, American anthropologist and academic (d. 1995)
1908 – Patsy Montana, American singer-songwriter and actress (d. 1996)
  1908   – U. Muthuramalingam Thevar, Indian politician (d. 1963)
  1908   – Peter Smith, English cricketer (d. 1967)
  1908   – Dmitry Ustinov, Marshal of the Soviet Union (d. 1984)
1909 – Homi J. Bhabha, Indian-French physicist and academic (d. 1966)
1910 – Luciano Sgrizzi, Italian-Monegasque organist and composer (d. 1994)
1910   – Miguel Hernández, Spanish poet and playwright (d. 1942)
1911 – Ruth Hussey, American actress (d. 2005)
1914 – Richard E. Holz, American minister and composer (d. 1986)
  1914   – Leabua Jonathan, Basotho lawyer and politician, 2nd Prime Minister of Lesotho (d. 1987)
  1914   – Anna Wing, English actress (d. 2013)
1915 – Fred W. Friendly, American journalist and producer (d. 1998)
  1915   – Jane Randolph, American-Swiss actress and singer (d. 2009)
1916 – Leon Day, American baseball player (d. 1995)
1917 – Bobby Bragan, American baseball player, coach, and manager (d. 2010)
  1917   – Minni Nurme, Estonian writer and poet (d. 1994)
  1917   – Nikolai Ogarkov, Russian field marshal (d. 1994)
  1917   – Maurice Trintignant, French race car driver (d. 2005)
1920 – Christy Ring, Irish sportsman (d. 1979)
1921 – Valli Lember-Bogatkina (d. 2016)
1922 – Jane White, American actress and singer (d. 2011)
  1922   – Iancu Țucărman, Romanian Holocaust survivor (d. 2021)
1923 – Gloria Oden, American poet and academic (d. 2011)
1924 – John P. Craven, American soldier and engineer (d. 2015)
1925 – Tommy Ridgley, American singer and bandleader (d. 1999)
1926 – Jacques Swaters, Belgian race car driver and manager (d. 2010)
1927 – Joe Adcock, American baseball player and manager (d. 1999)
1928 – Daniel Nathans, American microbiologist and academic, Nobel Prize laureate (d. 1999)
1929 – Olga Zubarry, Argentinian actress (d. 2012)
  1929   – Jean Chapman, English author
1930 – Néstor Almendros, Spanish-American director and cinematographer (d. 1992)
  1930   – Christopher Foster, English economist and academic
  1930   – Clifford Brown, American trumpet player and composer (d. 1956)
  1930   – Don Meineke, American basketball player (d. 2013)
1931 – Vince Callahan, American lieutenant and politician (d. 2014)
  1931   – David M. Wilson, Manx archaeologist, historian, and curator
1932 – Barun De, Indian historian and author (d. 2013)
  1932   – Louis Malle, French director, producer, and screenwriter (d. 1995)
1933 – Col Campbell, New Zealand gardener and television host (d. 2012)
1934 – Keith Barnes, Welsh-Australian rugby player and coach
  1934   – Frans Brüggen, Dutch flute player and conductor (d. 2014)
1935 – Robert Caro, American journalist and author
  1935   – Ágota Kristóf, Hungarian-Swiss author (d. 2011)
  1935   – Jim Perry, American baseball player
  1935   – Michael Winner, English director, producer, and screenwriter (d. 2013)
1936 – Polina Astakhova, Ukrainian gymnast and trainer (d. 2005)
  1936   – Dick Vermeil, American football player and coach
1937 – Claude Lelouch, French actor, director, producer, and screenwriter
  1937   – Brian Price, Welsh rugby player
1938 – Morris Lurie, Australian novelist, short story writer, and playwright (d. 2014)
1939 – Harvey Goldstein, English statistician and academic (d. 2020)
  1939   – Leland H. Hartwell, American biologist and academic, Nobel Prize laureate
  1939   – Eddie Holland, American singer-songwriter and producer
  1939   – Grace Slick, American singer-songwriter and model
1941 – Marcel Berlins, French-English lawyer, journalist, and academic (d. 2019)
  1941   – Aleksandr Dulichenko, Russian-Estonian linguist and academic
  1941   – Theodor W. Hänsch, German physicist and academic, Nobel Prize laureate
  1941   – Otis Williams, American singer-songwriter and producer
  1941   – Bob Wilson, English footballer and sportscaster
1942 – Sven-David Sandström, Swedish composer and historian (d. 2019)
1943 – Paul Claes, Belgian poet and translator
  1943   – Joanna Shimkus, Canadian actress
  1943   – David Triesman, Baron Triesman, English union leader and politician
1944 – Ahmed Chalabi, Iraqi businessman and politician (d. 2015)
1945 – Henry Winkler, American actor, comedian, director, and producer
1946 – Robert L. Gibson, American captain, pilot, and astronaut
  1946   – Andrea Mitchell, American journalist
  1946   – Anthony Shorrocks, English economist, author, and academic
  1946   – Chris Slade, Welsh drummer
1947 – Glenn Andreotta, American soldier (d. 1968)
  1947   – Timothy B. Schmit, American singer-songwriter and bass player
  1947   – Herschel Weingrod, American screenwriter and producer
1948 – Richard Alston, English dancer and choreographer
  1948   – Garry McDonald, Australian actor and screenwriter
1949 – Larry Gene Bell, American murderer (d. 1996)
1950 – Tim Sheens, Australian rugby league player and coach
1951 – Tony Bettenhausen Jr., American race car driver and businessman (d. 2000)
  1951   – Trilok Gurtu, Indian drummer and songwriter
  1951   – Harry Hamlin, American actor
  1951   – Poncho Sanchez, American singer and conga player
1953 – Pete Hoekstra, Dutch-American lawyer and politician
  1953   – Charles Martin Smith, American actor, director, and screenwriter
1954 – Mahmoud El Khatib, Egyptian footballer
  1954   – T. Graham Brown, American country singer-songwriter
  1954   – Jeannie Kendall, American country singer-songwriter
  1954   – Mario Testino, Peruvian-English photographer
1955 – Heidi Heitkamp, American lawyer and politician, 28th Attorney General of North Dakota
1956 – Juliet Stevenson, English actress
1957 – Shlomo Mintz, Israeli violinist and conductor
  1957   – Kevin Pollak, American actor, game show host, and producer
1958 – Olav Dale, Norwegian saxophonist and composer (d. 2014)
  1958   – Joe Delaney, American football player (d. 1983)
  1958   – Ramona d'Viola, American cyclist and photographer
1959 – Vincent Lagaf', French actor, singer, and game show host
1960 – Charnele Brown, American actress and singer
  1960   – Grayson Hugh, American singer-songwriter 
  1960   – Diego Maradona, Argentinian footballer, coach, and manager (d. 2020)
1961 – Scott Garrelts, American baseball player
  1961   – Giorgos Papakonstantinou, Greek economist and politician, Greek Minister of Finance
  1961   – Larry Wilmore, American comedian and television host
  1962   – Stefan Kuntz, German footballer and manager
1962 – Danny Tartabull, Puerto Rican baseball player
  1962   – Courtney Walsh, Jamaican cricketer
1963 – Michael Beach, American actor and producer
  1963   – Rebecca Heineman, American video game designer and programmer
  1963   – Andrew Solomon, American-English journalist and author
  1963   – Mike Veletta, Australian cricketer and coach
  1963   – Kristina Wagner, American actress
1964 – Adnan Al Talyani, Emirati footballer
  1964   – Humayun Kabir Dhali, Bangladeshi journalist and author
  1964   – Howard Lederer, American poker player
1965 – Gavin Rossdale, English singer-songwriter, guitarist, and actor 
1967 – Brad Aitken, Canadian ice hockey player
  1967   – Leonidas Kavakos, Greek violinist and conductor
1968 – Emmanuelle Claret, French biathlete (d. 2013)
  1968   – Jack Plotnick, American actor, director, and producer
  1968   – Ken Stringfellow, American singer-songwriter and guitarist
1969 – Stanislav Gross, Czech lawyer and politician, 5th Prime Minister of the Czech Republic (d. 2015)
  1969   – Snow, Canadian rapper and reggae singer-songwriter
  1969   – Vangelis Vourtzoumis, Greek basketball player
1970 – Ben Bailey, American comedian and game show host
  1970   – Tory Belleci, American visual effects designer and television presenter
  1970   – Christine Bersola-Babao, Filipino journalist and actress
  1970   – Nia Long, American actress
  1970   – Ekaterini Voggoli, Greek discus thrower
1971 – Fredi Bobic, Slovenian-German footballer and manager
  1971   – Tzanis Stavrakopoulos, Greek basketball player
  1971   – Peter New, Canadian actor, voice actor and screenwriters
  1971   – Suzan van der Wielen, Dutch field hockey player
1972 – Jessica Hynes, English actress, producer, and screenwriter
1973 – Michael Buettner, Australian rugby league player and official
  1973   – Silvia Corzo, Colombian lawyer and journalist
  1973   – Edge, Canadian wrestler and actor
  1973   – Michael Oakes, English footballer and manager
  1973   – Raci Şaşmaz, Turkish actor, producer, and screenwriter
1975 – Ian D'Sa, English-Canadian singer-songwriter, guitarist, and producer 
  1975   – Marco Scutaro, Venezuelan baseball player
1976 – Stern John, Trinidadian footballer
  1976   – Ümit Özat, Turkish footballer and manager
  1976   – Maurice Taylor, American basketball player
1978 – Martin Dossett, American football player
  1978   – Stephanie Izard, American chef
  1978   – Matthew Morrison, American singer-songwriter and actor
  1978   – Dan Poulter, English physician and politician
  1978   – Derren Witcombe, New Zealand rugby player and cricketer
1979 – Jason Bartlett, American baseball player
1980 – Choi Hong-man, South Korean wrestler and mixed martial artist
  1980   – Kareem Rush, American basketball player
  1980   – Rich Alvarez, Filipino-Japanese basketball player
1981 – Joshua Jay, American magician and author
  1981   – Jun Ji-hyun, South Korean model and actress
  1981   – Ayaka Kimura, Japanese singer and actress
  1981   – Ian Snell, American baseball player
  1981   – Ivanka Trump, American model and businesswoman
1982 – Stalley, American rapper
  1982   – Andy Greene, American ice hockey player
  1982   – Manny Parra, American baseball player
1983 – Trent Edwards, American football player
  1983   – Iain Hume, Scottish-Canadian footballer
  1983   – Maor Melikson, Israeli footballer
1984 – Eva Marcille, American model and actress
  1984   – Gedo, Egyptian footballer
  1984   – David Mooney, Irish footballer
  1984   – Isaac Ross, New Zealand rugby player
  1984   – Tyson Strachan, Canadian ice hockey player
1985 – Ragnar Klavan, Estonian footballer
1986 – Thomas Morgenstern, Austrian ski jumper
  1986   – Keisuke Sohma, Japanese actor
1987 – Ali Riley, New Zealand footballer
  1987   – Danielle Fong, Canadian entrepreneur, co-founder and Chief Scientist of LightSail Energy
1988 – Janel Parrish, American actress and singer
1989 – Ashley Barnes, Austrian-English footballer
  1989   – Nastia Liukin, Russian-American gymnast and actress
1990 – Suwaibou Sanneh, Gambian sprinter
1992 – Matt Parcell, Australian rugby league player
  1992   – Camila Silva, Chilean tennis player
1993 – Marcus Mariota, American football player
1994 – Mia Eklund, Finnish tennis player
1996 – Devin Booker, American basketball player

Deaths

Pre-1600
 526 – Paul of Edessa, Syriac Orthodox bishop of Edessa
1137 – Sergius VII, Duke of Naples
1282 – Ibn Khallikan, Iraqi scholar and judge (b. 1211)
1459 – Poggio Bracciolini, Italian scholar and translator (b. 1380)
1466 – Johann Fust, German printer (b. c. 1400)
1522 – Jean Mouton, French composer and educator (b. 1459)
1553 – Jacob Sturm von Sturmeck, German politician (b. 1489)

1601–1900
1602 – Jean-Jacques Boissard, French poet and illustrator (b. 1528)
1611 – Charles IX of Sweden (b. 1550)
1626 – Willebrord Snell, Dutch astronomer and mathematician (b. 1580)
1632 – Henri II de Montmorency, French admiral and politician (b. 1595)
1654 – Emperor Go-Kōmyō of Japan (b. 1633)
1680 – Antoinette Bourignon, French-Flemish mystic (b. 1616)
1685 – Michel Le Tellier, French lawyer and politician, French Secretary of State for War (b. 1603)
1690 – Hieronymus van Beverningh, Dutch diplomat and politician (b. 1614)
1730 – Nedîm, Turkish poet (b. 1681)
1757 – Osman III, Ottoman sultan (b. 1699)
  1757   – Edward Vernon, English admiral and politician (b. 1684)
1809 – William Cavendish-Bentinck, 3rd Duke of Portland, English politician, Prime Minister of the United Kingdom (b. 1738)
1816 – Frederick I of Württemberg (b. 1754)
1842 – Allan Cunningham, Scottish author and poet (b. 1784)
1853 – Pietro Raimondi, Italian composer (b. 1786)
1882 – William Forster, Indian-Australian politician, 4th Premier of New South Wales (b. 1818)
1883 – Dayananda Saraswati, Indian philosopher and scholar (b. 1824)
  1883   – Robert Volkmann, German pianist and composer (b. 1815)
1893 – John Abbott, Canadian lawyer and politician, 3rd Prime Minister of Canada (b. 1821)
1894 – Honoré Mercier, Canadian lawyer and politician, 9th Premier of Quebec (b. 1840)
1895 – James Patterson, English-Australian politician, 17th Premier of Victoria (b. 1833)
1896 – Carol Benesch, Czech architect, designed Peleș Castle (b. 1822)
1899 – William H. Webb, American shipbuilder and philanthropist (b. 1816)

1901–present
1905 – Boyd Dunlop Morehead, Australian politician, 10th Premier of Queensland (b. 1843)
1910 – Henry Dunant, Swiss activist, founded the Red Cross, Nobel Prize laureate (b. 1828)
1912 – Alejandro Gorostiaga, Chilean colonel (b. 1840)
  1912   – James S. Sherman, American lawyer and politician, 27th Vice President of the United States (b. 1855)
1915 – Charles Tupper, Canadian physician, lawyer, and politician, 6th Prime Minister of Canada (b. 1821)
1917 – Talbot Mercer Papineau, Canadian lawyer and soldier (b. 1883)
1919 – Ella Wheeler Wilcox, American author and poet (b. 1850)
1923 – Bonar Law, Canadian-English banker and politician, Prime Minister of the United Kingdom (b. 1858)
1929 – Norman Pritchard, Indian-English hurdler and actor (b. 1877)
1933 – Svend Kornbeck, Danish actor (b. 1869)
1942 – Walter Buckmaster, English polo player and stockbroker, co-founder of Buckmaster & Moore (b. 1872)
1943 – Max Reinhardt, Austrian-born American actor and director (b. 1873)
1957 – Fred Beebe, American baseball player and coach (b. 1880)
1961 – Luigi Einaudi, Italian economist and politician, 2nd President of the Italian Republic (b. 1874)
1963 – U. Muthuramalingam Thevar, Indian lawyer and politician (b. 1908)
1965 – Arthur M. Schlesinger, Sr., American historian and author (b. 1888)
1966 – Yiorgos Theotokas, Greek author and playwright (b. 1906)
1968 – Ramon Novarro, Mexican-American actor, singer, and director (b. 1899)
  1968   – Conrad Richter, American journalist and novelist (b. 1890)
  1968   – Rose Wilder Lane, American journalist and author (b. 1886)
1973 – Ants Lauter, Estonian actor and director (b. 1894)
1975 – Gustav Ludwig Hertz, German physicist and academic, Nobel Prize laureate (b. 1887)
1979 – Barnes Wallis, English scientist and engineer, inventor of the "bouncing bomb" (b. 1887)
1982 – Iryna Vilde, Ukrainian author and educator (b. 1907)
1987 – Joseph Campbell, American mythologist, scholar, and author (b. 1904)
1988 – T. Hee, American animator and screenwriter (b. 1911)
  1998   – Florence Nagle, English trainer and breeder of racehorses (b. 1894)
1990 – V. Shantaram, Indian actor, director, and producer (b. 1901)
1992 – Joan Mitchell, American painter (b. 1925)
1993 – Paul Grégoire, Canadian cardinal (b. 1911)
1996 – John Young, Scottish actor (b. 1916)
1997 – Samuel Fuller, American actor, director, producer, and screenwriter (b. 1912)
1999 – Maigonis Valdmanis, Latvian basketball player (b. 1933)
2000 – Steve Allen, American actor, television personality, game show panelist, and talk show host (b. 1921)
2002 – Juan Antonio Bardem, Spanish actor, director, and screenwriter (b. 1922)
  2002   – Jam Master Jay, American rapper and producer (b. 1965)
2003 – Steve O'Rourke, English race car driver and manager (b. 1940)
2004 – Phyllis Frost, Australian philanthropist, founded Keep Australia Beautiful (b. 1917)
  2004   – Peggy Ryan, American actress and dancer (b. 1924)
2005 – Al López, American baseball player and manager (b. 1908)
  2005   – Shamsher Singh Sheri, Indian politician (b. 1942)
2006 – Clifford Geertz, American anthropologist and author (b. 1926)
  2006   – Junji Kinoshita, Japanese playwright and scholar (b. 1914)
2007 – Washoe, American chimpanzee (b. 1965)
  2007   – Robert Goulet, American actor and singer (b. 1933)
  2007   – Linda S. Stein, American businesswoman and manager (b. 1945)
  2007   – John Woodruff, American runner and colonel (b. 1915)
2008 – Pedro Pompilio, Argentinian businessman (b. 1950)
2009 – Claude Lévi-Strauss, French anthropologist and ethnologist (b. 1908)
2010 – Harry Mulisch, Dutch author, poet, and playwright (b. 1927)
2012 – Franck Biancheri, French politician (b. 1961)
  2012   – Samina Raja, Pakistani poet and educator (b. 1961)
  2012   – Dan Tieman, American basketball player and coach (b. 1940)
2013 – Bill Currie, American baseball player (b. 1928)
  2013   – Pete Haycock, English singer-songwriter and guitarist (b. 1951)
  2013   – Michael Palmer, American physician and author (b. 1942)
  2013   – Frank Wess, American saxophonist and flute player (b. 1922)
2014 – Elijah Malok Aleng, Sudanese general and politician (b. 1937)
  2014   – Renée Asherson, English actress (b. 1915)
  2014   – Juan Flavier, Filipino physician and politician (b. 1935)
  2014   – Ida Elizabeth Osbourne, Australian actress and radio host (b. 1916)
  2014   – Bob Geigel, American wrestler and promoter (b. 1924)
  2014   – Thomas Menino, American businessman and politician, 53rd Mayor of Boston (b. 1942)
2015 – Mel Daniels, American basketball player and coach (b. 1944)
  2015   – Al Molinaro, American actor (b. 1919)
  2015   – Sinan Şamil Sam, Turkish boxer (b. 1974)
  2015   – Norm Siebern, American baseball player and scout (b. 1933)
2017 – Kim Joo-hyuk, South Korean actor (b. 1972)

Holidays and observances
Anniversary of the Declaration of the Slovak Nation (Slovakia)
Christian feast day:
Ethelnoth (Egelnoth) the Good
Blessed Dominic Collins (Catholic, Ireland, Society of Jesus)
Gerard of Potenza
Blessed Maria Teresa of St. Joseph
John Wycliffe (Episcopal Church (USA))
Marcellus of Tangier
Saturninus of Cagliari
Serapion of Antioch
Talarican (Tarkin)
Theonistus
Zenobios and Zenobia
October 30 (Eastern Orthodox liturgics)
Day of Remembrance of the Victims of Political Repressions (former Soviet republics, except Ukraine)
Thevar Jayanthi (Thevar community, India)
Mischief Night (Ireland, Canada, United Kingdom, United States and other places)

References

External links

 
 
 

Days of the year
October